René Springer (born 15 July 1979) is a German politician. Born in Berlin, he represents Alternative for Germany (AfD). René Springer has served as a member of the Bundestag from the state of Brandenburg since 2017.

Life 
He became member of the bundestag after the 2017 German federal election. He is a member of the Committee for Labour and Social Affairs.

References

External links 

  
 Bundestag biography 

1979 births
Living people
Members of the Bundestag for Brandenburg
Members of the Bundestag 2021–2025
Members of the Bundestag 2017–2021
Members of the Bundestag for the Alternative for Germany